Stefan Richarz (25 November 1874 – 13 July 1934) was a German priest, missionary and geologist.

Richarz was born in Richrath near Cologne, Germany in 1874. He joined the Divine Word Missionaries in 1893 at Steyl, Netherlands. He studied theology in the school of the order Sankt Gabriel in  Maria Enzersdorf near Mödling and received his ordination to the priesthood in 1901. Richarz studied geology, paleontology, petrology and chemistry at the   University of Vienna and later mineralogy, philosophy and geology at the University of Munich. He received his phD for work with Ernst Weinschenk and Ernst Freiherr Stromer von Reichenbach in 1919 from the University of Munich on basalts from a quarry near Groschlattengrün.

In the following years he taught geology and astronomy at the school of the order Sankt Gabriel. In 1921 he changed to the school of the Divine Word Missionaries in Techny, Illinois where he lectured on geology, chemistry, mathematics and astronomy. In 1933 Richarz became dean of the science department of the Catholic University of Peking. In his first year, he went on a geological  field trip to Mengyin County, South Shantung, China where he died  13. July, 1934.

References

1874 births
1934 deaths
20th-century German geologists
Divine Word Missionaries Order
German Roman Catholic missionaries
Roman Catholic missionaries in the United States
Roman Catholic missionaries in China
Missionary educators
German expatriates in the United States
German expatriates in China